Behkawa is a Pakistani social drama serial produced by Media City Productions and NZ Signature Films, directed by Mazhar Moin and written by Fasih Bari Khan. The drama stars Maria Wasti, Hina Dilpazir, Adnan Siddiqui, Nirvan Nadeem and Rubina Ashraf in lead roles, and was first aired on 9 February 2012 on Geo Entertainment.

Cast
Maria Wasti as Maya
Hina Dilpazir
Adnan Siddiqui as Zubair
Samina Ahmed
Rubina Ashraf
Anoushay Abbasi as Nagmana
Rashid Farooqui
Asma Abbas as Dilshad
Mirza Shahi
Nirvaan Nadeem as Bilal
 Akbar Islam
 Nazli Nasr
 Fazal Hussain
 Sara Razi as Sitara

References

Pakistani drama television series
Geo TV original programming
2012 Pakistani television series debuts
Urdu-language television